Doris Anyango Ogiro (born 19 November 1993) is a Kenyan footballer who plays as a defender. She has been a member of the Kenya women's national team.

International career
Anyango played for Kenya at the 2016 Africa Women Cup of Nations.

See also
List of Kenya women's international footballers

References

1993 births
Living people
Kenyan women's footballers
Women's association football defenders
Kenya women's international footballers